DFH Network is a pay platform that broadcasts Turkish television channels in Turkey. It was launched by Alinur Velidedeoğlu and Hakan Çizem. DFH Network carries 12 TV and 2 Radio stations, and has approximately 50,000 viewers. DFH Network uses Galaxy 19, 97° W satellite to broadcast to customers.

Broadcasts

Satellite Channels 
 DFH 1 (Broadcasts  ATV Avrupa for 24h)
 DFH 2 (Broadcasts  Show Türk for 24h) 
 DFH 3 (Broadcasts  Euro D for 24h)
 DFH 4 (Broadcasts  Fox TV for 24h)
 DFH 5 (Broadcasts  TV8 for 24h)
 DFH Spor TRT Spor

Other Channels 
 TRT Türk
 TRT 1
 Habertürk TV
 Create and Craft
 Dream Türk
 France 24
 CBC Canada
 Al Jazeera
 CNN Türk

Viewing Packages 
 DFH Basic (DFH1 + DFH2 + DFH3 + DFH4 + DFH5 + DFH6 + DFH7)
 DFH Premium (DFH Basic + DFH Sports)

External links 
 DFH Network
 DFH Network Subscription Page

Cable television in the United States
Television in the United States